The  was a DC electric multiple unit (EMU) train type formerly operated by the private railway operator Keikyu on commuter services in the Tokyo area of Japan from 1959 until June 2010.

Operations
The trains were used on the Keikyu Main Line, Keikyu Airport Line, Keikyu Daishi Line, Keikyu Zushi Line, and Keikyu Kurihama Line. They were also used on Toei Asakusa Line inter-running services until 2008. The last train made its final run in service on the Daishi Line on 28 June 2010.

Formations
The 1000 series fleet consisted of two-, four-, six-, and eight-car sets. By 2010, only four- and six-car sets remained in service, formed as shown below.

6-car sets

The M1 and M1c cars each had one lozenge-type pantograph.

4-car sets

The M1 and M1c cars each had one lozenge-type pantograph.

Interior

History
Four 800 series cars were built in 1958 as prototypes, based on the earlier 700 series design. The type was subsequently reclassified "1000 series", with a further 352 vehicles built from 1959 to 1978. The early batches had non-gangwayed driving cabs with 2 windscreen panes, similar to the 700 series, but later batches included a centre gangway door at the cab ends. Sets built from 1971 onwards had air-conditioning from new, whereas earlier sets were subsequently retrofitted with air-conditioning.

Withdrawals commenced in 1986 with the arrival of 1500 series trains. In 2008, one four-car set and one six-car set were repainted in early liveries to mark the 110th anniversary of Keikyu.

A special farewell train ran on 27 June 2010, and the last 1000 series sets remained in operation until 28 June on the Daishi Line.

Resale

A number of 1000 series cars were resold to the Takamatsu-Kotohira Electric Railroad ("Kotoden") in Shikoku, becoming the 1080 series and 1300 series. Other cars were also resold to the Hokuso Railway, becoming the Hokuso 7150 series.

The identities and histories of the 1000 cars sold to Kotoden are as shown below.

Preservation

Two 1000 series cars, 1351 and 1356, remain stored at Keikyu's Kurihama Works.

References

External links
  

Electric multiple units of Japan
1000 series
Train-related introductions in 1959
1959 in rail transport
Kawasaki multiple units
1500 V DC multiple units of Japan
Tokyu Car multiple units